Kate Sullivan (born 1976) is an American news anchor.

Kate Sullivan may also refer to:

 Kate Sullivan (legislator) (born 1950), Nebraska state senator
 Kate Sullivan (model), Irish model
 Kate Sullivan, a character in Other People's Money

See also
Katie Sullivan (disambiguation)
Catherine Sullivan (disambiguation)
Kathleen Sullivan (disambiguation)
Kathy Sullivan (disambiguation)